Ytterøyane Lighthouse is a coastal lighthouse in the municipality of Kinn in Vestland county, Norway.

History

It was first lit in 1881 and it was automated in 2004.

The cast iron tower is painted red with one white horizontal band; the base is painted white. The original 1st order Fresnel lens is still in use at the top of the tower.

The lighthouse is accessible only by boat.

See also

Lighthouses in Norway
List of lighthouses in Norway

References

External links
 Norsk Fyrhistorisk Forening 
 

Lighthouses in Vestland
Kinn
Lighthouses completed in 1881
1881 establishments in Norway